Selong is a city on the island Lombok and is also the capital of the East Lombok Regency in the Indonesian province West Nusa Tenggara.

Climate
Selong has a tropical savanna climate (Aw) with little to no rainfall from April to November and heavy rainfall from December to March.

References

Populated places in Lombok
Regency seats of West Nusa Tenggara